The men's 3000 metres at the 2016 IAAF World Indoor Championships took place on March 18 and 20, 2016.

The final race started as a jog for these athletes, coming through 1K in 2:52, and hitting the half way point at 4:15, Isiah Kiplangat Koech holding the lead.  With 6 laps to go, Caleb Mwangangi Ndiku ran around the field into the lead, the pace quickened, the rest of the field scrambling to react.  The strongest reaction was by Youssouf Hiss Bachir, literally sprinting into the lead 100 metres later, exchanging elbows with Ndiku.  For the next two and a half laps, Hiss Bachir held the lead, sprinting each time a challenger, usually Ndiku tried to creep past.  With three laps to go Abdalaati Iguider sped through the inside and as he challenged Ndiku everyone sped up and Hiss Bachir disappeared through the field.  The field began to string out.  With two laps to go, Yomif Kejelcha hit the lead, with Ndiku, Augustine Kiprono Choge, Iguider and Ryan Hill the only ones to give chase.  With a lap to go, the first four looked to challenge each other as Hill was falling back, but through the next to last turn, Hill began to accelerate catching Ndiku, who faded out the back.  Kejelcha held the lead the entire way to the finish for gold, Choge and Iguider were unable to make headway as the chased.  Coming off the final turn, Hill passed both of them, Choge in the final step, dipping at the line and dipping again in confusion after the line.

Records

Qualification standards

Schedule

Results

Heats
Qualification: First 4 (Q) and next 4 fastest (q) qualified for the semifinals.

Final
The race was started on March 20 at 13:10.

References

3000 metres
3000 metres at the World Athletics Indoor Championships